Isidro García Ayala (born 15 May 1976) is a Mexican former professional boxer who competed from 1994 to 2010. He held the WBO flyweight title from 1999 to 2000.

Professional career
In May 1998, Isidro won the WBO NABO flyweight title by beating veteran Everardo Morales and ended up making four title defences.

WBO flyweight title
On December 18, 1999 Ayala won the WBO Flyweight title by upsetting Puerto Rico's José López over twelve rounds. Lopez at the time was scheduled to fight Alejandro Montiel, who withdrew hours before the fight. Ayala, a spectator on that night, agreed to fight in Montiel's stead and won, to much surprise, using borrowed equipment. 
He also defended his title successfully against Jose Rafael Sosa in Córdoba, Argentina.

See also
List of Mexican boxing world champions
List of WBO world champions
List of flyweight boxing champions

References

External links

Boxers from the State of Mexico
World Boxing Organization champions
World flyweight boxing champions
Flyweight boxers
1976 births
Living people
Boxers from Los Angeles
Mexican male boxers
American male boxers